Mesa Grande Cultural Park, in Mesa, Arizona, preserves a group of Hohokam structures constructed during the Classic Period.  The ruins were occupied between AD 1100 and 1400 (Pueblo II – Pueblo IV Era) and were a product of the Hohokam civilization that inhabited the Salt River Valley.  There the Hohokam constructed an extensive system of water canals.  It is one of only two Hohokam mounds remaining in the metro Phoenix area, with the other being the Pueblo Grande Museum Archaeological Park. The site's central feature is a massive ruin of adobe walls and platforms.

It was listed on the National Register of Historic Places in 1978 when it was owned by B-movie actress Acquanetta and her husband Jack Ross.  The site was acquired from them in 1988 by the city of Mesa.

After the 2013 completion of the Mesa Grande Visitor's Center, the site is now seasonally open to the public from October, through May.

The Mesa Grande Cultural Park, as it is now known, is operated by the Arizona Museum of Natural History. The museum is currently undertaking archaeological studies at the site. The mound remains remarkably intact. The general site remains protected but undeveloped.

The ruins are located to the west and across the street from the former Mesa Lutheran Hospital, now a Banner Health corporate center housing billing and Information Technology employees.

Artifacts presumably associated with the ruins have been found in the neighborhood to the west.  Axe heads, arrow heads, and pottery sherds were regularly uncovered and collected by residents during the 1960s and 1970s just under the surface of the earth in private property there.

Gallery

See also
 Casa Grande Ruins National Monument
 Oasisamerica cultures

Notes

References

External links

 
 Arizona Museum of Natural History: Mesa Grande

Archaeological sites in Arizona
Archaeological sites on the National Register of Historic Places in Arizona
Buildings and structures in Mesa, Arizona
Hohokam
Native American history of Arizona
Native American pottery
Protected areas of Maricopa County, Arizona
Puebloan buildings and structures
National Register of Historic Places in Maricopa County, Arizona